Geert Berben (born 26 May 1993) is a Belgian footballer who plays as an attacking midfielder and is currently unemployed. He has signed a contract with Sporting Hasselt for the 2021–22 season.

External links

1993 births
Living people
Belgian footballers
Lommel S.K. players
Oud-Heverlee Leuven players
AS Verbroedering Geel players
Lierse Kempenzonen players
K. Patro Eisden Maasmechelen players
K.S.V. Roeselare players
Challenger Pro League players
Association football midfielders